Gwen Bloemen is a Dutch cricketer. In August 2019, she was named in the Dutch Women's Twenty20 International (WT20I) squad for the 2019 Netherlands Women's Quadrangular Series. She made her WT20I debut for the Netherlands, against Thailand, on 10 August 2019.

In October 2021, she was named in the Dutch team for the 2021 Women's Cricket World Cup Qualifier tournament in Zimbabwe.

References

External links
 

Year of birth missing (living people)
Living people
Dutch women cricketers
Netherlands women One Day International cricketers
Netherlands women Twenty20 International cricketers
Place of birth missing (living people)
21st-century Dutch women